The archaeological site of Sbeitla is an archaeological site in Sbeitla, in north-central Tunisia. It represents the Roman ruins of Sufetula, and contains the best preserved Roman forum temples in Tunisia. It was excavated and restored between 1906 and 1921.

History
The city was founded, if not already in existence, during the reign of Emperor Vespasian. Sufetula was the theatre of the great confrontation between Byzantines and Arabs in 647, setting the stage for the later Muslim conquest of the diocese of Sufetula and further conquests in southern Europe.

Main sights

Roman remains 

The Triumphal Arch of the Tetrarchy at the entrance to the city commemorates the four emperors that governed the empire in the year 300, just before the rule of Constantine the Great
The Public Baths
The Forum, one of the best preserved in the world
The Gate of Antoninus, which stands at the entrance to the forum and can be dated between 138 and 161. Its inscriptions make reference to Antoninus Pius and his two adopted sons, Lucius Verus and Marcus Aurelius
The three temples. Instead of constructing only one temple dedicated to the three most important Roman gods (Jupiter, Juno, and Minerva), the inhabitants of the city built separate temples for each one. A similar arrangement is also found at Baelo Claudia in Spain.
Other important buildings include the theater and the public fountains.

Byzantine remains
The majority of the Byzantine buildings stand on the foundations and incorporate elements of earlier Roman ones. They include:

The Basilica of Bellator (late 4th or early 5th century), named for a local bishop and including
The Chapel of Jucundus, which served as a baptistery and was named for an early 5th-century bishop buried there
The Basilica of Vitalis (5th-6th century), named for its founding presbyter. A basin predating the church and decorated by a fish mosaic was found under the floor of its nave.
The Church of Servus (5th century), named for its presbyter
The Church of Saints Gervase, Protase, and Tryphon

In Art and Literature
An engraving of a painting by Charles Bentley entitled Ruins of Sbeitlah, the ancient Sufetula, Tunis was published in Fisher's Drawing Room Scrap Book ,1838 with a poetical illustration by Letitia Elizabeth Landon, as

See also
 List of Ancient Roman temples
Gregory the Patrician, Byzantine exarch and self-proclaimed Emperor of Africa; killed in the Battle of Sufetula by the Muslims in 647

References

Roman towns and cities in Africa (Roman province)
Populated places of the Byzantine Empire